The year 542 BC was a year of the pre-Julian Roman calendar. In the Roman Empire, it was known as year 212  Ab urbe condita. The denomination 542 BC for this year has been used since the early medieval period, when the Anno Domini calendar era became the prevalent method in Europe for naming years.

Events
Jambuswami; the head of the Jain order for 44 years after the Nirvan of Mahaveer Swami, attained Nirvan at the age of 80 years old.

Births

Deaths

References

 
540s BC